Nerdist Industries, LLC is part of the digital division of Legendary Entertainment. Nerdist Industries was founded as a sole podcast (The Nerdist Podcast) created by Chris Hardwick but later spread to include a network of podcasts, a premium content YouTube channel, a news division (Nerdist News), and a television version of the original podcast produced by and aired on BBC America.

History
Nerdist Industries was formed in February 2012 after Hardwick and Peter Levin (GeekChicDaily) merged their separate entertainment projects into Nerdist Industries, after which GeekChicDaily was rebranded Nerdist News. The newly formed company began to produce additional podcasts under the Nerdist Industries banner as well as producing content and webshows for its Nerdist YouTube channel. In July 2012, Nerdist Industries was acquired by Legendary Entertainment. It was announced that Nerdist Industries would operate independently with Hardwick and Levin as its co-presidents.

Peter Levin left Nerdist Industries in 2013 and now heads Lionsgate's Interactive Ventures and Games. Hardwick then took over, and served as chief executive officer until 2015, when he relinquished operational control until the expiration of his contract in 2017, with the original Nerdist podcast and archives remaining under Hardwick's control under the new title ID10T with Chris Hardwick. His presence with the company, including as founder, was clarified and removed from the website on June 15, 2018 after abuse allegations were made against him by a former girlfriend. On August 10, 2018, his name was then returned to Nerdist's website.

Nerdist News

Nerdist News (founded February 2012; formerly GeekChicDaily) is the Nerdist branded pop culture newsletter, founded and originally operated by former Nerdist Industries CEO Peter Levin. The cross-platform publisher currently has two newsletter publications, Nerdist News and TOKYOPOP. GeekChicDaily became Nerdist News after it merged with Nerdist to form Nerdist Industries in February 2012. In late 2013 Nerdist News transitioned to a web series on YouTube channel "Nerdist", hosted by previous IGN Daily Fix presenter Jessica Chobot that airs five days a week to bring the latest news in nerdy pop culture.

Nerdist Podcast

The Nerdist Podcast, the flagship podcast of Nerdist Industries, is a weekly interview show launched February 8, 2010 "about what it really means to be a nerd" hosted by Web Soup and Talking Dead host Chris Hardwick, who is usually accompanied by Jonah Ray and Matt Mira. The audio podcasts are typically an hour in length and include conversations with notable comedians or entertainers, sometimes at their own home. Guests are varied, though typically relate to either stand-up comedy, nerd culture, or both, and have included CM Punk, Rob Zombie, Stan Lee, Ozzy Osbourne, Jeri Ryan, Drew Carey and several cast and crew of Community, Doctor Who, and Star Trek: The Next Generation.

In late 2017, Hardwick's future with Nerdist Industries and parent company Legendary Entertainment became unclear.  Although still technically CEO of Nerdist Industries, he considered his role to have become advisory, and no longer felt connected with the company.  As his contract with Legendary approached its end with no discussion about renewing, Hardwick – who retains full rights to the podcast, including its catalog of back episodes – decided to move the podcast.  Since he didn't have rights to use the Nerdist name on the podcast without heavy fees, and as part of a new venture, in February 2018 it was renamed to ID10T with Chris Hardwick.

Nerdist Podcast Network
During 2011, Nerdist began releasing various other podcasts.  the full range includes:
 Bizarre States, hosted by Jessica Chobot and Andrew Bowser
 Cashing In with T. J. Miller, hosted by Cash Levy with only guest T. J. Miller
 Cash Withdrawal, spinoff of Cashing In hosted by Cash Levy
 Chewin' It With Kevin and Steve, hosted by Kevin Heffernan and Steve Lemme
 Comic Book Club, hosted by Justin Tyler, Pete LePage, and Alex Zalben
 Competitive Erotic Fan Fiction, hosted by Bryan Cook
 Ding-Donger with Matt Braunger
 Dining with Doug & Karen, hosted by Karen Anderson and Doug Benson
 Half Hour Happy Hour, hosted by Alison Haislip and Alex Albrecht
 Hound Tall Discussion Series, hosted by Moshe Kasher
 The Jackie and Laurie Show, hosted by Jackie Kashian and Laurie Kilmartin
 James Bonding, a James Bond podcast hosted by Matt Gourley and Matt Mira
 The Jonah Keri Podcast, sports based podcast hosted by Jonah Keri
 The JV Club, hosted by Janet Varney
 The K-Ohle, a multi-format podcast hosted by Kurt Braunohler
 Kicking and Screaming, hosted by Jenna Elfman and Bodhi Elfman
 The Legacy Music Hour, hosted by Brent Weinbach and Rob F.
 Love, Alexi, hosted by Alexi Wasser
 Maltin on Movies, long form interview program, hosted by Leonard Maltin and Jessie Maltin
 Mike and Tom Eat Snacks, hosted by Michael Ian Black and Tom Cavanagh
 The Mutant Season, hosted by 13-year-old Gil
 Pop My Culture, hosted by Cole Stratton and Vanessa Ragland
 Pro You: Because You're Worth It, hosted by Tom J. Deters
 Sex Nerd Sandra, hosted by Sandra Daugherty
 Terrified, hosted by Dave Ross
 Today We Learned, hosted by Dan Casey and Razzle Dangerously
 The Todd Glass Show, hosted by Todd Glass
 Will You Accept This Rose?, Bachelor themed podcast hosted by Arden Myrin, Erin Foley and Eddie Pepitone
 You Made It Weird, hosted by Pete Holmes

Inactive/former podcasts 
 The Alton Browncast, a food and food personality based podcast hosted by Food Network star Alton Brown (active but no longer affiliated with Nerdist)
 Big Pop Fun, hosted by Tom Wilson
 Clonecast, a behind-the-scenes podcast of the television series Orphan Black
 FEaB ("Four Eyes and Beard"), hosted by Matt Mira and Scott Mosier; a co-production with the SModcast Podcast Network
 Humans From Earth, hosted by Geoff Boucher
 The Indoor Kids, a video game-centred podcast hosted by Kumail Nanjiani and Emily V. Gordon
 Jonah Raydio, a music-based podcast hosted by Jonah Ray (active, but now hosted by the Maximum Fun network)
 Making It, hosted by Riki Lindhome
 Mission Log: A Roddenberry Star Trek Podcast, in-depth discussions about every Star Trek episode and Movie hosted by John Champion and Ken Ray (active but no longer affiliated with Nerdist)
 Nerdist Comics Panel, hosted by Len Wein, Ben Blacker, Heath Corson, and Adam Beechen (inactive since December 2017)
 The Nerdist Podcast, former flagship podcast which became the ID10T Podcast and moved to Cadence13
 Puck Soup, hosted by Greg Wyshynski and Dave Lozo
 Talkin' Toons with Rob Paulsen
 Thrilling Adventure Hour, scripted show based on old timey radio shows (became active again in 2018 after a hiatus, is now hosted by the Forever Dog podcast network).
 Watkins Family Hour, led by Sean Watkins and Sara Watkins at Largo
 We're Alive, A Story of Survival
 The Wrestling Compadres Slamcast
 The Writers Panel (formerly Nerdist Writers Panel), moderated by Ben Blacker (moved to the Forever Dog podcast network)

Nerdist Showroom
The Nerdist Showroom, also known as NerdMelt or the NerdMelt Showroom, was a performance space operated in collaboration with, and located inside, Meltdown Comics in Los Angeles, California. The showroom opened in April 2011 and ran through March 2018. It featured the Nerdist logo near the entrance, plush chairs, dark walls, and a far off green room. Performances included live stand-up comedy, storytelling shows, sketch comedy, movie screenings, writer's panels and podcast recordings. It was also the home of the Comedy Central television series The Meltdown with Jonah & Kumail. Past performers include Louis C.K., Jim Gaffigan, Dan Harmon, Kumail Nanjiani, Jonah Ray, and Robin Williams.

The Showroom closed with Meltdown on March 31, 2018, after the building's owners sold it to a developer planning to construct a new residential development along two blocks.

YouTube channel
Content featured on Nerdist's YouTube channel. includes:
 4 Points – interview show hosted by Alex Albrecht and Alison Haislip
 Ain't It Cool with Harry Knowles – a video version of Harry Knowles website Ain't It Cool News, a TV and film news, rumour and review site
 Awkward Family Photos
 Because Science with TBD
 Breaking Belding
 Chris Hardwick's All-Star Celebrity Bowling – a celebrity bowling competition where teams compete for the charities of their choice
 Comic Book Club – a video version of the podcast of the same name
 COPS: Skyrim – a voice-over Cops-style parody of the game Skyrim
 The Dan Cave – hosted by Dan Casey
 DIY Dammit
 Double Jump
 DVK: Daniel Van Kirk
 Dr. Tran – animated shorts featuring Dr. Tran
 Face To Face: With Weird Al Yankovic – a celebrity interview show with "Weird Al" Yankovic
 Fangoria's Blood and Guts – a show about monster makeup and gore effects hosted by Scott Ian
 Game Off
 Grammar Slam – presented by former professional wrestler CM Punk
 Hero Complex – interview show hosted by Geoff Boucher of Hero Complex magazine and website, featuring interviews with prominent film and TV personnel
 The Indoor Kids – a video version of the popular podcast, a video-game-based show hosted by Kumail Nanjiani and Emily Gordon
 Info Minute
 Just Cos – a series based around cosplay and conventions
 Justice League of America
 Justin Willman's Magic Meltdown – series featuring magician Justin Willman performing magic
 Math Bites
 Mothership – a weekly podcast hosted by Jessica Chobot & Hector Navarro (airs on Alpha but available on YouTube as well)
 Muskwatch – hosted by Kyle Hill & Dan Casey  last episode 31st July 2018
 Neil's Puppet Dreams – Neil Patrick Harris stars as himself and has dreams featuring puppets
 Nerd Down & 10 – the Sklar brothers break down nerd and pop culture topics as if they were sports
 Nerdist Comedy Shorts
 Nerdist News – a video version of the Nerdist News
 NerdTerns
 Nerdy Jobs with Matt Bennett
 Reasons to be scared of the Future
 Realm of LARP – a series about the world of live action role-playing
 Set List: Stand-Up Without A Net – stand-up comedy performances
 Sifl & Olly
 Simian Undercover Detective Squad (S.U.D.S.) – odd couple ape detectives Skreet and Yeager are forced to partner up and solve crime
 Skyrim at the Movies
 Star Talk – a video version of the StarTalk Radio podcast, a science-based show hosted by Dr. Neil DeGrasse Tyson
 Superego
 The Thrilling Adventure Hour – a video version of The Thrilling Adventure Hour podcast
 They Call Me Baba Booey – Gary Dell'Abate (aka Baba Booey), producer of the Howard Stern Show and tech and audio enthusiast, explores the latest products and pop culture
 Try This At Home! with Crabcat Industries
 Tournament of Nerds – a show featuring nerds debating each other about their favorite pop culture characters
 UCB Presents: Between the Scenes
 Weird Sh*t From Japan – Jukka Hilden explores aspects of Japanese culture under the watchful eye of Japanophile and comedian Chad Mullane
 What You Missed By Not Playing
 Write Now! With Jimmy Pardo – Pardo hosts this show where a team of writers write jokes on the fly about a guest stand-up comedian

Other 
 @midnight – Produced for Comedy Central

References

External links
 

 
Entertainment companies based in California
Mass media companies of the United States
Companies based in Burbank, California
American companies established in 2012
Entertainment companies established in 2012
Mass media companies established in 2012
2012 establishments in California
Dalian Wanda Group
Podcasting companies